() is the name given to the economic reforms initiated in Vietnam in 1986 with the goal of creating a "socialist-oriented market economy". The term  itself is a general term with wide use in the Vietnamese language meaning "innovate" or "renovate". However, the Đổi Mới Policy refers specifically to these reforms that sought to transition Vietnam from a command economy to a socialist-oriented market economy.

The Đổi Mới economic reforms were initiated by the Communist Party of Vietnam in 1986 during the party's 6th National Congress. These reforms introduced a greater role for market forces for the coordination of economic activity between enterprises and government agencies and allowed for private ownership of small enterprises and the creation of a stock exchange for both state and non-state enterprises.

Background 
After reunification in 1976, the economy of Vietnam was plagued by enormous difficulties in production, imbalances in supply and demand, inefficiencies in distribution and circulation, soaring inflation rates, and rising debt problems. Vietnam's gross domestic product (GDP) in 1984 was valued at US$18.1 billion with a per capita income estimated to be between US$200 and US$300 per year. Reasons for this mediocre economic performance have included severe climatic conditions that afflicted agricultural crops, bureaucratic mismanagement, extinction of entrepreneurship, and military occupation of Cambodia (which resulted in a cutoff of much-needed international aid for reconstruction).

From 1978 until 1991, Vietnam was a member of the Comecon, and therefore was heavily dependent on trade with the Soviet Union and its allies. Following the dissolution of the Comecon and the loss of its traditional trading partners, Vietnam was forced to liberalize trade, devalue its exchange rate to increase exports, and embark on a policy of economic development.
In the years immediately prior to the Đổi Mới Reforms, Vietnam faced an economic crisis; inflation soared to over 700 percent, economic growth slowed down, and export revenues covered less than the total value of imports. In addition, Soviet aid decreased, increasing Vietnam's international isolation. This resulted in intense debate within the Communist Party about the efficacy of the command economy system and the possibility of reform in the run up to the 6th National Congress of the Communist Party of Vietnam in December 1986.

One of the important developments which provoked change within the Party was the death of Party General Secretary, Lê Duẩn, in July 1986. In December 1986, the Sixth Party Congress elected as Party Secretary the more liberal Nguyễn Văn Linh, a reformist and former leader of the National Liberation Front.

Early reforms 
While Đổi Mới was officially introduced at the 6th National Congress of the Communist Party of Vietnam in 1986, the state had initiated reforms in the early 1980s. Specifically, in October and November 1978, cooperative leaders in the north were permitted to rent out fields to members during the winter as long as the latter produced winter crops collectively for required number of days and return the land in time for growing paddy in the spring.

At the Six Party Plenum in August 1979, the Party allowed for the decentralization of economic decision making related to farming and introduced more incentives for production expansion. In 1980, Provincial governments were permitted to establish trading firms, breaking the monopoly of foreign trade by the central state in Vietnam. In 1981, agricultural reforms were introduced, which allowed farmland to be distributed to individual workers, individual management of a collective, and farmers could retain all production beyond their farming quota. These agricultural reforms contributed to the recovery of industrial output. Following these measures, price controls were removed from numerous consumer products to increase trade at real-market prices and ease shortages of them within the state trade system.

Creation of the socialist-oriented market economy

Reforms in the 1990s 
The 6th National Congress of the Communist Party of Vietnam was convened on 15 December 1986 and lasted until 18 December. The Congress reaffirmed its commitment to the reform program of the 8th plenum of the 5th Central Committee, and issued five points;
 "concerted efforts to increase the production of food, consumer goods and exportable items";
 "continue the efforts to control small merchants and capitalists, while at the same time acknowledging the reality of supporting a mixed economy";
 "to regenerate the planning bureaucracy while making the economic management system more efficient by decentralizing authority and making room for more independent decision-making";
 "to clarify the powers and jurisdiction of the Council of Ministers, and the reorganization of state management apparatus to make it more efficient;
 "to improve party organizational capabilities, leadership and cadre training."

Võ Văn Kiệt, a Deputy Chairman of the Council of Ministers, delivered the Economic Report to the 6th National Congress. The political and economic reports stressed Đổi Mới (Renovation), and Vietnam specialist Carlyle Thayer wrote that Võ Văn Kiệt may have been the foremost advocate of this concept. In his speech to the Congress, Võ Văn Kiệt said, "in the economic field, there will be renovation in economic policies and the management system." Võ Văn Kiệt said that agriculture and not heavy industry would be most important during the 4th Five-Year Plan. During the 4th Five-Year Plan, Võ Văn Kiệt said, "[t]he ... main orientation for heavy industry in this stage is to support agriculture and light industry on a proper scale and at an appropriate technical level." Võ Văn Kiệt stressed the role of exports and the production of grain, food, and consumer goods to revitalize the Vietnamese economy. The main objective of the 4th Five-Year Plan was the production of grain and food products; "a target of 22–30 million metric tons of grain in paddy" was set for 1990. While several methods were to be used to reach this goal, material incentives and end-product contracts would play a prominent role. The Central Management System was abolished and the economic focus was shifted to the creation of a market-driven economy with different sectors, and competition between the private sector and the state in non-strategic sectors. In 1987, inspection stations along the national highway were removed to allow more efficient flow of goods and services between different municipalities. Markets where private agricultural products were allowed to be sold were rapidly growing.

Subsequently, the National Assembly introduced the 1987 Foreign Investment Law with a desire to "mobilize every means to attract foreign capital for local development," (Foreign Investment Law 1987) even permitting complete foreign ownership of domestic physical assets and outlawing the prospects of nationalization.

Privately owned enterprises were permitted in commodity production (and later encouraged) by the Communist Party of Vietnam. The first half of the 1990s observed changes in the legal framework for the private sector. In 1990, Law on Private Enterprises which provided a legal basis to private firms was enacted, while Companies Law acknowledged Joint-stock company and private limited liability company. In the same year, the Party began discussing the potential of privatizing state-owned enterprises (SOEs), while also normalizing relations with the People's Republic of China. Subsequently, the 1992 Constitution officially recognized the role of the private sector.

In the agricultural sector, the Land Law was enacted in 1988, which recognized private land use rights. In addition, Central Committee Resolution 10 was issued; according to this resolution, farmers were not obliged to participate in cooperatives and were permitted to sell their products on the free market. Also, the Resolution returned land-use rights to private households and recognized them as autonomous economic units. As a result, the agriculture sector and the rural economy began shifting from autarky to commodity production, allowing each region to produce according to their comparative market advantage. In this renewed economic model, the state retreated to a regulative role, with the market determining the prices of goods and services.

In the early 1990s, Vietnam accepted some World Bank reform advice for market liberalization, but rejected structural adjustment programs and conditional aid funding requiring privatization of state-owned enterprises. With the reforms, the number of private enterprises increased; and by 1996, there were 190 joint stock companies and 8,900 limited liability companies registered. The private sectors played an important role in the service industry, as the share in the retail trade activity increased from 41% to 76% in 1996.

Throughout this period, the National Assembly introduced various corporate and income tax deductions to spur both domestic and foreign investment. In terms of rural development, the government restructured the rural economy away from agriculture by incentivizing small and handcraft villages and training labor for the industrial sector.

While foreign trade was centrally controlled by the state, the state started to loosen control of foreign trade. Consumer goods were sent back home by Vietnamese who worked or studied in the socialist countries in the first stages up to the reunification. The sources of commercial goods diversified since then; these varied from gifts shipped by overseas Vietnamese to their families, to goods left over during the US occupation of the south which were tradable in the Soviet for raising capital. Further, neighboring countries such as Laos and Cambodia provided opportunities to smuggle goods into Vietnam. There were two types of goods smuggling from Cambodia; the first one included those left behind by victims of the Khmer Rouge, while the other were those imported from Thailand. For instance, Thai beer being imposed high duties was usually smuggled by the sea route into Vietnam.

Successes 

As a result of vast privatization and economic reforms, Vietnam underwent a miraculous economic transformation in the 1990s. In specific, the early periods of reform (1986–1990) saw an average GDP growth of 4.4 percent per year, with the average GDP growth rate accelerating to approximately 6.5 percent per year from 1990 until the Asian Financial Crisis of 1997. In terms of scale, Vietnam's GDP grew almost five times from $6.472 billion in 1990 to $31.173 billion in 2000, while GDP per capita grew from $95 in 1990 to $390 in 2000. That is to show, both production and the standards of living improved over this period. Unlike many other fast-growing economies, the Vietnamese government diverted tax revenue collected from the expansion of economic activities to ensure that underdeveloped areas receive adequate investment in infrastructure and welfare. As a result, poverty rates declined significantly in most provinces, while income also recorded significant growth in metropolitan areas and provinces where levels of investment were high. As the overall investment environment and legal transparency improves, approximately $18.3 billion of actual foreign direct invested capital flowed into the Vietnamese economy. This increased FDI inflow provided the much-needed capital for economic growth, while also creating jobs for laborers in rural provinces and led to positive technological spillover. For instance, provinces with high FDI inflow such as Vinh Phuc or Binh Duong, the unemployment rates declined more significantly than the national rate, while their local income per capita also grew significantly. For local businesses, increased FDI inflow created more opportunity to partner with foreign firms through joint ventures and to supply parts and services for foreign firms, while also allowing locals to reap the benefits of technological spillover from FDI. Over time, these local businesses can develop their own production capacity, even becoming strategic partners with foreign investors.

Limitations 

Despite recording high GDP growth, the Vietnamese economy still had many structural problems heading to the new century. Without experience in managing a market economy, income inequality, negative environmental and social effects still pose a major threat as the country began eyeing integration into the global economy. State-owned enterprises, which still made up a significant portion of the economy, remained inefficient and are plagued by problems of corruption. In terms of poverty alleviation, despite recording a significant decline in the national poverty rate, absolute poverty was still rampant in mountainous provinces and provinces along the central coast. Not only so, relative poverty and the urban-rural income gap continue to be on the rise. In major metropolitan areas, affordable housing was lacking, thus hindering further potential growth in living standards for internal migrant labor. Despite recording high FDI inflow, the majority of FDI still focused on exploiting Vietnam's cheap labor and low environmental standards, thus hindering de facto sustainable growth. In terms of technological spillover, many domestic firms still lack the capacity to reap the benefits of increased FDI inflows. In various high-value added industries, especially the retail industry, FDI firms have grown to dominate the domestic market, crowding out domestic private investors. Even more, profits created by foreign investment tend to be repatriated to their home countries, and thus do not get reinvested into the local economy as profits for a domestic firm would. In terms of technological development, the economy's automation rate and the stock of highly-skilled labor remained low. The working environment, at the same time, remains highly inefficient and unwelcoming towards further reform, so much so that the country now experiences a major brain drain.

Theoretical basis 
The Communist Party of Vietnam maintains that the socialist-oriented market economy is consistent with the classical Marxist view of economic development and historical materialism, where socialism can only emerge once material conditions have been sufficiently developed to enable socialist relations. The socialist-oriented market model is seen as a key step for achieving the necessary economic growth and modernization while being able to co-exist in the contemporary global market economy and benefit from global trade. The Communist Party of Vietnam has re-affirmed its commitment to the development of a socialist economy with its Đổi Mới reforms.

See also 

 Five-Year Plans of Vietnam
 Economic history of Vietnam
 Socialist market economy
 Socialist-oriented market economy
 Transition economy
 State capitalism
 Socialism with Chinese characteristics
 Perestroika

References

Bibliography

Further reading 
 Chen, J and Vu, A. Vietnam after the regional economic crisis.
 Murray, Geoffrey. Vietnam : Dawn of a New Market. New York : St. Martin's Press, 1997.
 Pham, Minh Chinh, and Vuong, Quan Hoang. Kinh te Viet Nam – Thang tram va Dot pha. Hanoi: NXB Chinh Tri Quoc Gia, 2009.
 
 Vincent Edwards and Anh Phan (2014) Managers and Management in Vietnam. 25 Years of Economic Renovation (Doi moi). Routledge.

External links 
 Vuong, Quan Hoang and Tran, Tri Dung. "The Cultural Dimensions of the Vietnamese Private Entrepreneurship". ICFAI Journal of Entrepreneurship Development, VI(3&4), pp. 54–78, Sept.-Dec. 2009.  ICFAI University Press. (article)
 Fulbright Economics Teaching Program in Vietnam

1986 establishments in Vietnam
1986 in Vietnam
20th century in Vietnam
Communism in Vietnam
Communist Party of Vietnam
Economic history of Vietnam
Economic liberalization
History of Vietnam
Mixed economies
Reform in Vietnam
Vietnamese words and phrases
Political catchphrases